Shutruk-Nakhunte (sometimes Nahhunte) was king of Elam from about 1184 to 1155 BC (middle chronology), and the second king of the Shutrukid Dynasty. 

Elam amassed an empire that included most of Mesopotamia and western Iran. 
Under his command, Elam defeated the Kassites and established the short-lived Elamite Empire, conquered within about 40 years by Nebuchadnezzar I of Babylon, in 1120 BC.

Šutruk-Nakhunte was married to the daughter of a Kassite king named Meli-Šipak.

Inscription on the Naram-Sin victory stele
Shutruk-Nahhunte is known by an inscription that he added to the Victory Stele of Naram-Sin, itself dated about one millennium earlier to circa 2250 BC. His inscription appears on the top right corner of the stele, on the depiction of a mountainous cone, and was written in Elamite by Shutruk-Nahhunte himself:

In popular culture

Shutruk-Nakhunte gained a small public exposition in Ethan Canin's short story "The Palace Thief", and its adaptation in the 2002 film The Emperor's Club, in which one of the key elements is a plaque describing the exploits of Shutruk-Nakhunte, described as a once famous egomaniacal conqueror virtually unknown today.

The plaque hanging on the wall of the film reads...

'I am Shutruk Nahunte, King of Anshand and Susa, Sovereign of the land of Elam. By the command of Inshushinak I destroyed Sippar, Took the Stele of Niran-Sin, and brought it back to Elam, where I erected it as an offering to my god, Inshushhinak.' — Shutruk-Nahunte, 1158 B.C.’

Sources

 D.T. Potts: The Archaeology of Elam, Cambridge University Press, Cambridge 1999, 232-237

Elamite kings
Late Bronze Age collapse
Shuturukid dynasty